Charles William Duncan  Hutchison (1918–1993) was a British-Ghanaian anti-fascist, soldier, and ambulance driver most famous for being the only Black-British member of the International Brigades during the Spanish Civil War. In Spain he was one of the youngest, one of the longest serving, and one of the first English-speaking volunteers. Citing his experiences as a man of colour and his childhood spent in an orphanage, Hutchison was an ardent anti-fascist and was involved in helping organise anti-fascist activists that took part in the Battle of Cable Street. Immediately joining the British military following Britain's declaration of war against Nazi Germany, Hutchison served the British Army between 1939-1946. During this time he took part in the Dunkirk evacuation, the Italian campaign, North African campaign, and the liberation of Bergen-Belsen concentration camp. Hutchison spent almost 10 years engaged in battles against various fascist forces throughout Europe, before starting a family in 1947 and living the rest of his life quietly in South England. 

Despite his achievements, the details of his life were not fully revealed to historians until 2019, following a history project kickstarted by London school children.

Early life and orphanage 
Charlie Hutchison was born in Eynsham, west of Oxford. He was the fourth of five children belonging to Lilly Rose (Harper) from Eynsham, and Charles Francis from the Gold Coast (now Ghana). His father would make frequent visits to the Gold Coast, before unexpectedly disappearing, leaving Hutchison's mother in severe mental and financial hardship. Soon afterwards, Hutchison and one of his sisters were temporarily taken to a National Children's Home and Orphanage in Harpenden, Hertfordshire. After spending several years in the orphanage, Hutchison was allowed to leave and was reunited with his mother who was living in Fulham.

By 1935, Hutchison had joined the Young Communist League (YCL) branch in Fulham and quickly became the branch's leader while also working as a lorry driver. As a leading member of London's communist movement, Charlie helped organise anti-fascist resistance in the Battle of Cable Street against the British Union of Fascists and played a part in forcing the fascists to abandon their march and retreat.

Spanish Civil War 
In December 1936, Hutchison went to Spain and joined the International Brigades to fight against the Nationalist faction supported by Fascist Italy and Nazi Germany during the Spanish Civil War. Becoming a machine-gunner, he was joined by many fellow London activists including Winston Churchill's nephew Esmond Romilly, Charles Darwin's great-grandson John Cornford, Communist Party intellectual Ralph Winston Fox. The British Battalion had not yet been fully formed by the time Hutchison first arrived in Spain, so he joined the British and Irish dominated No. 1 Company of the mainly French Marseilla. Hutchison was not only one of the earliest British volunteers and one of the youngest but was also the only black or mixed-race British volunteer to join the International Brigade. When asked why he fought in Spain, Hutchison said: "I am half black, I grew up in the National Children's Home and Orphanage. Fascism meant hunger and war". During his service, his superior officers described him as "hard working", and commented on how developed his political views were for his age.

Hutchison fought for the International Brigade during almost the entirety of the war and was sent to the front-line to fight in the Battle of Lopera shortly after arriving in Spain. During this battle, his fellow communist volunteers Fox and Cornford were both killed, and Hutchison was badly wounded. According to Bill Alexander of the British Battalion, Hutchison refused to be sent back to Britain and instead served as an ambulance driver for the 5th Republican Army Corps. In April 1937, Hutchison's mother contacted the Republican government and pleaded with them to force him to return to Britain. Hutchison requested temporary leave, yet due to a logistics blunder, his leave was never granted. He continued to serve the Spanish Republic until December 1938, when he returned to Britain to continue his activism as a member of the Communist Party of Great Britain.

Second World War 
Soon after returning to the UK, Hutchison barely had time to conduct further communist activism when Britain entered World War II. He immediately joined the British military and served in France before taking part in the 1940 Dunkirk evacuation. Afterwards, he served in Northern Africa, fought through Italy, and by 1944 was serving with the British Army in Iran. Near the end of the war, he fought in France and into Germany, where he was among the soldiers who took part in the liberation of the Bergen-Belsen concentration camp in April 1945.

Death and legacy 
After the end of his military service in 1946, Hutchison returned to Fulham and in 1947 married a fellow communist called Patrica Holloway. He resumed his work as a lorry driver and was an active member of the Transport and General Workers' Union, and was also active within anti-apartheid activism and nuclear disarmament. Spending the remainder of his life as a dedicated communist activist, Hutchison died in Bournemouth in 1993, aged 74.

In 2019, a memorial event was held at the Marx Memorial Library in London to celebrate the life of Charlie Hutchison as a part of Black History Month. The attendants included 16 members of Hutchison's family, and students from Newham Sixth Form College who showcased their art and poetry projects to celebrate Hutchison's life and examine his reasons for fighting in Spain. During the event, Hutchison's son John spoke of his experiences being raised by his father, describing Charlie's love of boxing and that their home was filled with "books by Marx, Salinger, Steinbeck and Hugo". The research into Hutchison's life conducted by the same sixth-form students would lead to the creation of their college's 'African Studies Centre'. One of the students was Noah Anthony Enahoro, grandson of Nigerian independence leader Anthony Enahoro, was one of the researchers who presented their findings to Hutchison's family.

Much of the information historians know about Charlie Hutchison's life has only been discovered very recently and has been recorded in few histories of the Spanish Civil War, two being Richard Baxell's Unlikely Warriors (2012), and the Communist Party of Britain's Red Lives (2020).

See also 
 Dorothy Kuya
Claudia Jones
Billy Strachan
Trevor Carter
Len Johnson

Citations 

1918 births
1993 deaths
British Army soldiers
Military personnel from Oxfordshire
International Brigades personnel
Black British activists
People from Witney
Black British soldiers
English people of Ghanaian descent
English anti-fascists
Communist Party of Great Britain members
British people of the Spanish Civil War
British Army personnel of World War II